Eglantine Vierzonnaise Football was a French association football club founded in 1937. They were based in the town of Vierzon and their home stadium was the Stade Albert Thevenot.

The club was dissolved in July 2015.

References

External links
Englantine Vierzon official website 

Defunct football clubs in France
Association football clubs established in 1937
Association football clubs disestablished in 2015
Sport in Cher (department)
1937 establishments in France
Football clubs in Centre-Val de Loire
2015 disestablishments in France